West Tripura is an administrative district in the state of Tripura in India. The district headquarters are located at Agartala. As of 2012 it is the most populous district of Tripura (out of 8).

Geography

Climate

District Profile
The information provided below are taken from a book based on 2012 statistics, all the names, infos, details, etc. are in effect from and on 2012

Divisions
West Tripura District has Three sub-divisions: 
Mohanpur Subdivision
Jirania Subdivision
Sadar Subdivision

West Tripura District has 9 Blocks: 
Bamutia
Belbari
Dukli
Hezamara
Jirania
Lefunga
Mandwi
Mohanpur
Old Agartala

Lok Sabha constituencies
West Tripura district is located in two Lok Sabha constituencies: Tripura West (shared with South Tripura district), and Tripura East (shared with South Tripura, Dhalai and North Tripura districts).

Demographics

According to the 2011 census West Tripura district has a population of 1,725,739, roughly equal to the nation of The Gambia or the US state of Nebraska. This gives it a ranking of 281st in India (out of a total of 640). Its population growth rate over the decade 2001-2011 was 12.5%. West Tripura has a sex ratio of 964 females for every 1000 males, and a literacy rate of 88.91%. After reorganization, the residual district had a population was 918,200. 64.12% of the population lived in urban areas. Scheduled Castes and Scheduled Tribes made up 192,475 (20.96%) and 176,596 (19.23%) of the population respectively.

West Tripura had 851,203 Hindus, 32,420 Muslims and 30,554 Christians.

At the time of the 2011 census, 76.23% of the population spoke Bengali, 17.69% Kokborok and 2.04% Hindi as their first language.

Flora and fauna
In 1987 West Tripura district became home to the Sipahijola Wildlife Sanctuary, which has an area of 18.5 km2.

References

External links
 Official Website of West Tripura District

 
Districts of Tripura